Benxi Steel Group Corp., Ltd. known as Benxi Steel Group (or Bengang in China) is a Chinese holding company based in Benxi, Liaoning Province, for two steel making group.

The company was formed in 2010 as the holding company for Benxi Iron and Steel (Group) Co., Ltd. and Beitai Iron and Steel (Group) Co., Ltd., the latter now known as Benxi Beiying Iron and Steel (Group) Co., Ltd..

According to World Steel Association (Chinese companies data was provided by China Iron and Steel Association), the corporation was ranked the 21st in 2015 the world ranking by production volume.

It was owned by State-owned Assets Supervision and Administration Commission (SASAC) of Liaoning Provincial People's Government.

History
In 1905, after the Russo-Japanese War, Liaoning fall under the sphere of influence of Japan. Japanese Okura Kihachiro opened a coal mine in Benxi. After the protest of Qing Government, it became a Sino-Japanese joint venture in 1910 (as ). In the next year the company added "Iron" in the denomination (as ). After the Mukden Incident, the company was under sole Japanese control until the end of World War II. During Chinese Civil War, in 1948 the company and Liaoning fall under Communist Party of China controls. In 1953, the coal mine was separated from the company as Benxi Mining Bureau. It was one of the 512 important state-owned enterprises in 1997. (1 of 47 iron and steel industry)

In 2005 a merger between Benxi Iron and Steel and Anshan Iron & Steel Group Corporation was announced but never materialized. In 2010 a new holding company was formed to takeover "Benxi Iron and Steel" and "Beitai Iron and Steel", located in Beitai, a town in Pingshan District, Benxi. The latter was owned by SASAC of Benxi City, but was transferred to Liaoning SASAC in order to finalize the merger. In August 2021, Bengang began a merger with Ansteel Group which, once completed, will create the third largest metal producer in the world.

Subsidiaries
Bengang Steel Plates, a subsidiary of Benxi Iron and Steel, is a listed company in Shenzhen Stock Exchange. As at 7 November 2016, Bengang Steel Plates was a constituent of SZSE 1000 Index (top 1000 companies by capitalization) and SZSE 700 Sub-Index (the 301st to 1,000th companies by capitalization), but not a constituent of SZSE Component Index (top 500 companies by capitalization), making the listed company was ranked between the 501st to 1000th by free float adjusted market capitalization.

References

External links
 
 History of Benxi Steel Group

Steel companies of China
Companies based in Liaoning
Manufacturing companies established in 1910
Chinese companies established in 1910
Companies owned by the provincial government of China
Non-renewable resource companies established in 1910
Holding companies established in 2010
1910 establishments in China
2010 establishments in China
Benxi